Periklis Korovesis (20 July 1941 – 11 April 2020), also published as Pericles Korovessis, was a Greek author and journalist and a member of the Hellenic Parliament.

Biography
Korovesis was born in Argostoli, Kefalonia, in 1941. He studied theatre with Dimitris Rontiris and Semiotics with Roland Barthes. He also attended some classes of Pierre Vidal-Naquet in Paris. From an early age, Korovesis participated actively in the democratic movement. During the military junta (1967–1974) he was arrested, imprisoned and exiled. His first book, The Method: A Personal Account of the Tortures in Greece (Anthropofylakes in Greek), is a personal account of the tortures that he experienced at the police headquarters in Bouboulinas Street at the time of the Colonels' military junta. Korovesis' story was a significant testimony for Amnesty International and the Council of Europe in order to file charges against the regime of the colonels for the appalling treatment of political prisoners.

Parliamentary and social activities
Korovesis was an elected Member of Parliament with the left-wing party Coalition of the Radical Left (SY.RIZ.A) in the 2007 Greek legislative election for the Athens A constituency. He failed to be re-elected MP in 2009 elections. He was an advocate of human rights, immigrants, environmental issues and Greek diaspora.

Books
Korovesis' first book titled Anthropofylakes has been translated into French (Seuil, 1969), English (Allison & Busby, 1970, and Panther, 1970), Swedish (Rubén et Sjӧrgen, 1970), Finnish (Weilin+Gӧӧs, 1970), Norwegian (Gyldendal, 1973), Turkish (Yӧntem, 1972, & Alan Yayincilik, 1989), German (Zweitausendeins,1981 and Raith,1976), Portuguese (Publicaciōes Europa-America,1970).  He also wrote poetry and children's stories.

Korovesis wrote articles for Eleftherotypia, Epochi and Efimerida ton Syntakton newspapers and for the magazine Galera. His personal blog was titled Left Recycling.

Death
Korovesis died, aged 78, in an Athens hospital on 11 April 2020.

References

External links
 Korovesis' personal blog
 Korovesis' Hellenic Parliament homepage (in Greek)

1941 births
2020 deaths
Greek journalists
Greek MPs 2007–2009
Greek prisoners and detainees
Greek torture victims
Greek writers
People from Argostoli
Syriza politicians
Resistance to the Greek junta